Telemaco Arcangeli (4 July 1923 – 18 November 1998) was an Italian racewalker.

Biography
He competed in the 1952 Summer Olympics without being able to reach the final.

Achievements

References

External links
 

1923 births
1998 deaths
Athletes from Rome
Italian male racewalkers
Olympic athletes of Italy
Athletes (track and field) at the 1952 Summer Olympics
20th-century Italian people